Quintus Servaeus was a former praetor who was appointed by Germanicus to govern Commagene in 17 AD. In the spring of 20 AD he was involved in preparing an indictment of murder against Gnaeus Calpurnius Piso.

Notes

1st-century BC births
1st-century deaths
1st-century BC Romans
1st-century Romans